DJ & the Fro is an animated series that aired on MTV. The show focuses on two co-workers, DJ and The Fro, who work at the fictitious company Oppercon Industries. They rarely do work, and instead look for funny videos on the Internet, which they comment on (similar to Beavis and Butthead and Station Zero with music videos). The series was created by Dave Jeser and Matt Silverstein, who originally created Comedy Central's Drawn Together.

Within weeks of its debut, DJ & the Fro was moved from its 5:00 pm (est) time slot to 12:30 am (est) time slot due to the Parents Television Council deeming it "too racy for daytime T.V."

Cast
 Matt Silverstein as DJ
 Nat Faxon as The Fro
 Cree Summer as Doreen, Gigi, Additional voices
 James Arnold Taylor as Ken, Mr. Balding, Additional voices

Episodes

External links
 
 DJ & The Fro: Jersey animation guys Jeser and Silverstein are back

References

2000s American adult animated television series
2000s American daily animated television series
2000s American workplace comedy television series
2009 American television series debuts
2009 American television series endings
American adult animated comedy television series
American television series with live action and animation
Animated duos
Beavis and Butt-Head
English-language television shows
Fictional duos
MTV cartoons
MTV weekday shows
Television series created by Dave Jeser
Television series created by Matt Silverstein
Television remakes